At Harvard University the Committee on Degrees in Social Studies is the committee that runs the honors-only, interdisciplinary concentration in social science subjects for undergraduate students. Founded in 1960, it reflects the belief that the study of the social world requires an integration of the disciplines of history, political science, sociology, economics, anthropology, and philosophy. All students are required to complete a senior thesis.

Founders
Stanley Hoffmann, an authority on international relations;
Alexander Gerschenkron, an eminent economic historian;
H. Stuart Hughes, a specialist in European intellectual history;
Barrington Moore Jr., a political sociologist writing about Soviet society and revolutions;
Robert Paul Wolff, a student of political and social theory, who became head tutor for the first year of the program

Chairs
David S. Landes 1981–1993
Charles Maier 1993–1997
Seyla Benhabib 1997–2001
Grzegorz Ekiert 2001–2006
Richard Tuck 2006–

Notable alumni
Chuck Schumer, senior U.S. Senator from New York and current Senate Majority Leader, 1971
Bill Ackman, American investor and hedge fund manager, CEO of Pershing Square Capital Management, 1988
E.J. Dionne, Washington Post columnist, 1973
Ajit Pai, Chairman of the FCC, 1994
Dean Wareham, musician (Galaxie 500, Luna), 1985
Tom Morello, musician (Rage Against the Machine, The Nightwatchman, and Audioslave), 1986
Merrick B. Garland, Attorney General of the United States, judge for the United States Court of Appeals for the District of Columbia Circuit (and Obama Supreme Court Associate Justice nominee), 1974
Mickey Kaus, journalist, blogger, and 2010 Senate candidate, 1973
Michael Kremer, developmental economist, winner of the Nobel Memorial Prize in Economics, 1985
Mark Whitaker, former Editor of Newsweek, 1979
Adam Cohen, journalist and author, 1984
Dean Norris, actor, 1985
Joshua Redman, jazz musician, 1986
Ben Mezrich, author, 1991
Lucy H. Koh, federal judge, 1990
Charles Sabel, MacArthur Fellow and noted political economist at Columbia University
Jason Furman, Chairman of President Barack Obama's Council of Economic Advisors (CEA)
Emily Chang, the anchor and executive producer of Bloomberg Technology, 2002
Holden Karnofsky, co-founder of GiveWell and Open Philanthropy, 2003

Footnotes

External links
Committee on Degrees in Social Studies
Social Studies and ‘The Harvard Problem’
Social Studies -- It's Just Like Grade School!

Harvard University